This World and the Other (original Portuguese title: Deste Mundo e do Outro) is a volume of newspaper articles by the Nobel Prize-winning author José Saramago. It was first published in 1971.

References

Novels by José Saramago
1971 novels
20th-century Portuguese novels
Portuguese-language novels